The Battle of Deres was a fight between the Spartans and the Messenians which occurred c. 684 BC. It was the first major military engagement of the Second Messenian War. The Spartans and Messenians didn't have any allies at the time of the conflict and the outcome of the battle was highly disputed. Neither side won a clear victory, but Aristomenes is said to have achieved more than it seemed that one man could, so that, as he was of the race of the Aepytidae, the Messenians offered to make him king after the battle. However, he declined the offer, preferring instead to become general with absolute powers. The Spartans were outraged by this.

This battle did not take place at the Lakonian Dereion, but one would expect Derai to mean a "small hill". the place-name Dera occurs in a fragmentary late second century Messenian inscription, which appears to have been a definition of the Messenian borders with Arcadia, otherwise, nothing else is known about this place.

References

Ancient Sources
 Pausanias (geographer) 4.15.4

Deres
Deres
7th century BC
Deres
684 BC
7th century BC in Greece